Ørjan Løvdal (born 24 September 1962 in Svolvær, Norway) is a Norwegian ice hockey player and coach. He spent most of his career with Stjernen Hockey of the Norwegian Elitserien.  He also played for the Norwegian national ice hockey team, and participated at the Winter Olympics in 1984, 1988, and 1992. He was Norwegian champion in 1986. He was awarded Gullpucken as best Norwegian ice hockey player in 1986 and 1987.

Career statistics

References

External links

1962 births
Living people
Hammarby Hockey (1921–2008) players
Ice hockey players at the 1984 Winter Olympics
Ice hockey players at the 1988 Winter Olympics
Ice hockey players at the 1992 Winter Olympics
Norwegian expatriate ice hockey people
Norwegian ice hockey coaches
Norwegian ice hockey centres
Olympic ice hockey players of Norway
People from Vågan
Stjernen Hockey coaches
Stjernen Hockey players
Sportspeople from Nordland